Emile Berliner (May 20, 1851 – August 3, 1929) originally Emil Berliner, was a German-American inventor. He is best known for inventing the lateral-cut flat disc record (called a "gramophone record" in British and American English) used with a gramophone. He founded the United States Gramophone Company in 1894; The Gramophone Company in London, England, in 1897; Deutsche Grammophon in Hanover, Germany, in 1898; and Berliner Gram-o-phone Company of Canada in Montreal in 1899 (chartered in 1904). Berliner also invented what was probably the first radial aircraft engine (1908), a helicopter (1919), and acoustical tiles (1920s).

Early life 
Berliner was born in Hanover, Germany, in 1851 into a Jewish merchant family. Though Jewish, his religious persuasion would develop into agnosticism. He completed an apprenticeship to become a merchant, as was family tradition. While his real hobby was invention, he worked as an accountant to make ends meet. To avoid being drafted for the Franco-Prussian War, Berliner migrated to the United States of America in 1870 with a friend of his father's, in whose shop he worked in Washington, D.C. He moved to New York and, living off temporary work, such as doing the paper route and cleaning bottles, he studied physics at night at the Cooper Union Institute.

Career
After some time working in a livery stable, Berliner became interested in the new audio technology of the telephone and phonograph. He invented an improved telephone transmitter, one of the first type of microphones. The patent was acquired by the Bell Telephone Company (see The Telephone Cases), but contested, in a long legal battle, by Thomas Edison. On February 27, 1901, the United States Court of Appeals would declare Berliner's patent void and awarded Edison full rights to the invention. "Edison preceded Berliner in the transmission of speech," the court would write. "The use of carbon in a transmitter is, beyond controversy, the invention of Edison".  

Berliner moved to Boston in 1877, where became a United States citizen four years later. He worked for Bell Telephone until 1883, when he returned to Washington and established himself as a private researcher.

Gramophone 

In 1886, Berliner began experimenting with methods of sound recording and reproduction. He was granted his first patent for what he called the "Gramophone" in 1887. The patent described recording sound using horizontal modulation of a stylus as it traced a line on a rotating cylindrical surface coated with an unresisting opaque material such as lampblack, subsequently fixed with varnish and used to photoengrave a corresponding groove into the surface of a metal playback cylinder. In practice, Berliner opted for the disc format, which made the photoengraving step much less difficult and offered the prospect of making multiple copies of the result by some simpler process such as electrotyping, molding, or stamping. In 1888, Berliner was using a more direct recording method, in which the stylus traced a line through a very thin coating of wax on a zinc disc, which was then etched in acid to convert the line of bared metal into a playable groove.

By 1890, a Berliner licensee in Germany was manufacturing a toy Gramophone and five-inch hard rubber discs (stamped-out replicas of etched zinc master discs), but because key U.S. patents were still pending they were sold only in Europe. Berliner meant his Gramophone to be more than a mere toy, and in 1894 he persuaded a group of businessmen to invest $25,000, with which he started the United States Gramophone Company. He began marketing seven-inch records and a more substantial Gramophone, which was, however, still hand-propelled like the smaller toy machine.

The difficulty in using early hand-driven Gramophones was getting the turntable to rotate at an acceptably steady speed. Engineer Eldridge R. Johnson, the owner of a small machine shop in Camden, New Jersey, helped Berliner develop a suitable low-cost wind-up spring motor for the Gramophone, then to manufacture it. Berliner gave Frank Seaman the exclusive sales rights in the U.S., but after disagreements Seaman began selling his own version of the Gramophone, as well as unauthorized copies of Berliner's records; ultimately, Berliner was legally barred from selling his own products. The U.S. Berliner Gramophone Company shut down in mid-1900 and Berliner moved to Canada. Following various legal maneuvers, Johnson founded the Victor Talking Machine Company in 1901 and the trade name "Gramophone" was completely and permanently abandoned in the U.S., although its use continued elsewhere. The Berliner Gramophone Co. of Canada was chartered on 8 April 1904 and reorganized as the Berliner Gramophone Co. in 1909 in Montreal's Saint Henri district.

Rotary engine and helicopters 
Berliner also developed a rotary engine and an early version of the helicopter. According to a July 1, 1909, report in The New York Times, a helicopter built by Berliner and J. Newton Williams of Derby, Connecticut, had Williams "from the ground on three occasions" at Berliner's laboratory in the Brightwood neighborhood of Washington, D.C.

Between 1907 and 1926, Berliner worked on technologies for vertical flight, including a lightweight rotary engine. Berliner obtained automobile engines from the Adams Company in Dubuque, Iowa, whose  Adams-Farwell automobile used air-cooled three- or five-cylinder rotary engines developed in-house by Fay Oliver Farwell (1859–1935). Berliner, his assistant R.S. Moore, and Farwell developed a 36-hp rotary engine for use in helicopters, an innovation on the heavier inline engines then in use. 

In 1909, Berliner founded the Gyro Motor Company in Washington, D.C. The company's principals included Berliner, president; Moore, designer and engineer; and Joseph Sanders (1877–1944), inventor, engineer, and manufacturer. The manager of the company was Spencer Heath (1876–1963), a mechanical engineer who was connected with the American Propeller Manufacturing Company, a manufacturer of aeronautical related mechanisms and products in Baltimore, Maryland. By 1910, Berliner was experimenting with the use of a vertically mounted tail rotor to counteract torque on his single-main-rotor design, a configuration that led to practical helicopters of the 1940s. The building used for these operations exists at 774 Girard Street NW, Washington, D.C., where its principal facade is in the Fairmont-Girard alleyway. On June 16, 1922, Berliner and his son, Henry, demonstrated a helicopter for the United States Army. 

Henry became disillusioned with helicopters in 1925, and the company shut down. In 1926, Henry Berliner founded the Berliner Aircraft Company, which merged to become Berliner-Joyce Aircraft in 1929.

Other 
Berliner's other inventions include a new type of loom for mass-production of cloth and an acoustic tile.

Berliner, who suffered a nervous breakdown in 1914, also advocated for improvements in public health and sanitation. He also advocated for women's equality and, in 1908, established a scholarship program, the Sarah Berliner Research Fellowship, in honor of his mother. Berliner also supported and advocated Zionism.

Awards
Berliner was awarded the Franklin Institute's John Scott Medal in 1897, the Elliott Cresson Medal in 1913, and the Franklin Medal in 1929.

Death
On August 3, 1929, Berliner died of a heart attack at his home at the Wardman Park Hotel in Washington, D.C., at the age of 78. He is buried in Rock Creek Cemetery in Washington, D.C., alongside his wife and a son, Herbert Samuel Berliner.

Publications

Books 

Conclusions, 1899, Levytype Corporation, Philadelphia
The Milk Question and Mortality Among Children Here and in Germany: An Observation, 1904, The Society for Prevention of Sickness
Some Neglected Essentials in the Fight against Consumption, 1907, The Society for Prevention of Sickness
A Study Towards the Solution of Industrial Problems in the New Zionist Commonwealth, 1919, N. Peters
Muddy Jim and other rhymes: 12 illustrated health jingles for children, 1919, Jim Publication Company.

Patents 

Patent images in Tag Image File Format
 Telephone (induction coils), filed October 1877, issued January 1878
 Telephone (carbon diaphragm microphone), filed August 1879, issued December 1879
 Microphone (loose carbon rod), filed September 1879, issued February 1880
 Microphone (spring carbon rod), filed Nov 1879, issued March 1880
UK Patent 15232 filed November 8, 1887
 Gramophone (horizontal recording), original filed May 1887, refiled September 1887, issued November 8, 1887
 Process of Producing Records of Sound (recorded on a thin wax coating over metal or glass surface, subsequently chemically etched), filed March 1888, issued May 1888
 Combined Telegraph and Telephone (microphone), filed June 1877, issued November 1891
 Sound Record and Method of Making Same (duplicate copies of flat, zinc disks by electroplating), filed March 1893, issued October 1895
 Gramophone (recorded on underside of flat, transparent disk), filed November 7, 1887, issued July 1896

References

Further reading

External links 

 
 Emile Berliner and the Birth of the Recording Industry at the Library of Congress including audio archive and family tree
 Emile Berliner: Inventor of the Gramophone (Library of Congress)
 Berliner - Inventor of the Gramophone and the "flat" record - Canadian Communication Foundation
 Berliner timeline and patent list
 The Berliner helicopters at the National Air and Space Museum
 Berliner helicopter at College Park, Maryland
 Berliner in the Inventor's Hall of Fame
 Illustrated Berliner page 
 Contents of Berliner's case file at The Franklin Institute contains evidence and correspondence with Berliner regarding the award of his 1929 Franklin Medal for acoustic engineering and development of the gramophone
 Musée des ondes Emile Berliner in Montreal, Quebec contains over 30,000 recordings and other artifacts
 Website Emil Berliner Studios in Berlin, Germany – The History of the Record by Peter K. Burkowitz (the other side)

1851 births
1929 deaths
19th-century American inventors
20th-century American inventors
American agnostics
American health activists
American women's rights activists
American Zionists
Burials at Rock Creek Cemetery
Cooper Union alumni
Discovery and invention controversies
German agnostics
German emigrants to the United States
19th-century German inventors
German people of Jewish descent
Jewish agnostics
People from the Kingdom of Hanover